Archibald McAllister (October 12, 1813 – July 18, 1883) was a Democratic member of the U.S. House of Representatives from Pennsylvania.

Early life and education
Archibald McAllister (grandson of John Andre Hanna, and the paternal nephew of the George Washington McAllister, the owner of Strathy Hall) was born at Fort Hunter, Pennsylvania, near present-day Harrisburg, Pennsylvania.  He attended the common schools and Dickinson College in Carlisle, Pennsylvania.  He moved to Blair County, Pennsylvania, in 1842 and engaged in manufacturing charcoal iron at Springfield Furnace, Pennsylvania.

Career
McAllister was elected as a Democrat to the Thirty-eighth Congress. Although he was a Democrat, he supported the passage of the Thirteenth Amendment. During the congressional debate, McAllister justified his new stance because he saw destroying "the corner-stone of the Southern Confederacy" as the only path to peace. He was not a candidate for renomination in 1864.

Later life and death
He resumed the manufacture of iron and died in Royer, Pennsylvania.  He is interred in Mountain Cemetery.

Sources

The Political Graveyard

1813 births
1883 deaths
Politicians from Harrisburg, Pennsylvania
Democratic Party members of the United States House of Representatives from Pennsylvania
19th-century American politicians